In the UK a local authority waste disposal company (LAWDC) is an arms length waste management operator.  These companies were created when the waste management industry was privatised. Some of these companies have now been sold on to larger commercial waste companies and some are still owned by local authorities.

LAWDC Waste Disposal Companies

Current
AD Waste, Flintshire
Amgen Cymru, Rhondda Cynon Taff, Amgen Cymru website
County Environmental Services, Cornwall, CES website
CWM Ltd, Cumbria, CWM website
CWM Environmental Ltd, Carmarthenshire, CWM Environmental website
Greater Manchester Waste, Greater Manchester, GM Waste website
Mersey Waste Holdings Limited, Merseyside,
NEWS (Norfolk Environmental Waste Services), Norfolk, 
Local Asbestos Removal Contractors, Warrington, Local asbestos removal contractors
Asbestos Removal Manchester, Greater Manchester, Asbestos Removal Manchester NEWS website
Premier Waste, Durham, Premier Waste website
Silent Valley Waste Services, Blaenau Gwent, Silent Valley Waste Services website
Swansea City Waste Disposal Company, Swansea
Yorwaste, North Yorkshire, Yorwaste

Sold on
3C Waste Management - Cheshire - sold to Waste Recycling Group
Coventry and Solihull Waste Disposal Company - Coventry & Solihull
Landfill Management - Wigan
Poplars Resource Management - Staffordshire - sold to Biffa
Sheffield City Waste Management - Sheffield City
Suffolk Waste Disposal - Suffolk
Surrey Operational Services - Surrey
The Waste Company - Gloucestershire - sold to Cory Environmental
Wastewise Waste Management - Humberside
Wyvern Waste - Somerset - sold to Viridor

See also

List of waste management companies
Waste management

References

Waste management companies of the United Kingdom